Duowei News, originally named Chinese News Net, was a Chinese language news website established in 1999 based in New York City, United States. The website was also known as Multidimensional News, and specialized in Chinese political news.

Duowei News was blocked in Mainland China. In 2013, Jason Q. Ng of China Digital Times and Citizen Lab considered the outlet to be critical of mainland China and the PRC government's policies. According to Radio France Internationale in 2018, the site has been accused of having a pro-Beijing view point and promoting Chinese Communist Party propaganda.

History
Duowei News, whose original domain name was chinesenewsnet.com, was founded by Ho Pin (何频) on 11 January 1999, who used to work for a Chinese state-run newspaper but left due to negative feelings towards the 1989 Tiananmen Square protests and massacre.

On June 27, 2004, Duowei's new domain name, dwnews.com, was created. In 2009, the website was sold to the Hong Kong media mogul Yu Pun-hoi.

Ho Pin now publishes Mingjing News. Duowei has a news bureau in Beijing.

Duowei News correctly predicted the lineups of the 16th and 17th National Congress of the Chinese Communist Party in 2002 and 2007 respectively.

Duowei News closed on 26 April 2022.

References

External links

Mingjing News

American news websites
Chinese news websites
Internet properties established in 1999
1999 establishments in New York (state)
Internet properties disestablished in 2022
2022 disestablishments in China